Peter Cook (1937–1995) was a British comedian.

Peter Cook may also refer to:

Peter Cook (MP), Member of Parliament for Leominster, 1390 and 1391
 Peter Cook (antiques) (1924–2003), Australian antique dealer and For Love or Money panelist
 Peter Cook (English footballer) (1927–1960), English footballer
 Peter Cook (Australian footballer) (born 1932), Australian footballer for Melbourne
 Peter Cook (architect) (born 1936), British architect
 Peter Cook (Australian politician) (1943–2005), Australian senator
 Peter Cook (jockey) (born 1950), retired Australian jockey
 Peter Cook (born c. 1959), architect and fourth husband of Christie Brinkley
 Peter Cook (press secretary), financial news anchor and press secretary
 Peter Mackenzie (born Peter Cook, 1961), American actor
 Peter Samuel Cook (1928–2004), British serial rapist

See also
Peter Coke (1913–2008), English actor, playwright and artist
Peter Cooke (disambiguation)